The 2010 SEAT León Supercopa Spain season is the ninth SEAT León Supercopa Spain season. The season consists of six triple-header meetings, beginning at Circuit Ricardo Tormo on April 17 and concluding at Circuit de Catalunya on October 31.

Teams and drivers

Calendar

Championship standings
Point system: 10, 8, 7, 6, 5, 4, 3, 2, 1, 1, 1, 1 for races 1 and 2, while race 3 awards 20, 17, 14, 12, 10, 8, 6, 5, 4, 3, 2, 1. 1 point for Fastest lap awarded in all races.

References

Seat Leon Supercopa